Darius Hanks (born February 23, 1989) is a former American football wide receiver. He played college football at the University of Alabama. Despite being projected as a fifth round draft pick, he was signed by the Washington Redskins as an undrafted free agent in 2012.

Professional career

Hanks was signed by the Washington Redskins as an undrafted free agent on April 29, 2012. He was waived-injured on August 13 due to suffering a shoulder injury when making a diving catch during training camp. After not being claimed off waivers, Hanks was officially put on the team's injured reserve list.

In April 2013, Hanks was waived by the Redskins after failing a physical.

References

External links
Washington Redskins bio
Alabama Crimson Tide bio

1989 births
Living people
People from Norcross, Georgia
Sportspeople from the Atlanta metropolitan area
Players of American football from Georgia (U.S. state)
American football wide receivers
Alabama Crimson Tide football players
Washington Redskins players